William of Marseille was a thirteenth-century English academic, teaching in France. He is known for the medical-astrological treatise De urina non visa. The method is to apply a horoscope to deduce properties of the urine of a patient, when that cannot be obtained; and then to proceed to diagnosis. This book was still used at the University of Bologna in 1405. .

Works
From this PDF
Astrologia
De urina non visa (1219)
Tabula de stellis fixis
Tractatus de meteoris (c. 1230)

References 
 
 
 Laurence Moulinier-Brogi (2012). « William the Englishman’s De urina non visa and its fortune », London—Read at the conference "Medical Prognosis in the Middle Ages"

Notes

English astrologers
13th-century astrologers
13th-century Latin writers
13th-century English writers